Yuzhou may refer to:

 Yuzhou, Henan (禹州), a city in Henan, China
 Yuzhou District (玉州区), Yulin, Guangxi, China
 Yuzhou (historical prefecture), seated in modern Yu County, Hebei, China
 Yuzhou (蔚州镇), a town in modern Yu County, Hebei, China
 Yuzhou (ancient China) (豫州), one of the nine provinces of ancient China
 Yuzhou (豫州), a former prefecture in roughly modern Runan County, Henan, China
 Yuzhou (豫州), a former prefecture in modern Anhui, China
 Yuzhou (豫州), a former prefecture in roughly modern Hua County, Henan, China
 Yuzhou (豫州), a former prefecture in roughly modern Dali County, Shaanxi, China
 Yuzhou (豫州), a former prefecture in roughly modern Xingyang, Henan, China
 Yuzhou (豫州), a former prefecture in roughly modern Jarud Banner, Inner Mongolia, China
 Yuzhou (渝州), a former prefecture in modern Chongqing, China

See also
 Youzhou, sometimes written Yu Chou in older works